Ghafir ("The All-Forgiving", referring to God), also known as Al-Muʼmin (The Believer), is the 40th chapter (sūrah) of the Qur'an, with 85 verses (āyāt). It takes its name from verse 28, which mentions a distinguished believer from among the clan of the Pharaoh who supported Moses, referring to him as a "believing man," hence al-Mu'min; The Believer. However, this surah is most often called al-Ghafir (the All-Forgiving) because of the Divine Name mentioned in verse 3.

Regarding the timing and contextual background of the  believed revelation  (asbāb al-nuzūl), it is a "Meccan surah", which means it is believed to have been revealed in Mecca, rather than later in Medina.

Summary
1-3 The Quran a revelation from the only true God 
4 It is denied by none but unbelievers 	
4-6 Confederated infidels, however prosperous, are doomed 	
7-9 The angels intercede for true believers 	
10-12 Infidels shall repent in hell, but in vain
13-15 God to be worshipped as the Supreme Being
16-18 Judgment Day shall come suddenly
19-21 Ungodly men shall have no intercessor
22-23 Former infidels destroyed to warn those coming after
 24-25 Moses called a sorcerer and a liar  
26-27 He and his followers persecuted by Pharaoh and his people 
28 Moses takes refuge in the Lord 
29-30 A true believer espouses the cause of Moses 
31-37 He warns Pharaoh and his people against unbelief 
38-39 Pharaoh orders a tower to be built up to heaven 
40 Pharaoh regards Moses as a liar 
41-47 The true believer exhorts the Egyptians to believe in the God of Moses 
48 God delivers the true believer from the devices of Pharaoh and his people 
49 Pharaoh and his people condemned to hell-fire
50-53 Infidels shall reproach each other in hell, and call on their keepers for help in vain
54-55 God assists his apostles in this world and in the next
56 Moses received the Book of the Law
57 Muhammad commanded to be patient, and to ask pardon for his sin
 58 Muhammad to fly for refuge to God against proud infidels
59 God manifested to creation, but few men understand 
60 The righteous and the evil not equal 
61 The judgment-day sure to come 62 Rejectors of God shall be rejected 
63-66 The true God rejected by ungrateful men 
67-68 The true God alone to be worshipped 
69-70 God the Sovereign Creator of all things
71-76 The miserable lot of those who reject the Scriptures
77 Muhammad to persevere patiently
78 No apostle ever wrought miracles without God’s permission
79-81 God revealed in his works of providence
82-83 Former infidels were destroyed for their unbelief
84-85 They all repented when too late to avail

Exegesis (Tafsir)

Q40:55 
Translation: So be patient, [O Muhammad]. Indeed, the promise of Allah is truth. And ask forgiveness for your sin and exalt [ Allah ] with praise of your Lord in the evening and the morning.Infallibility is an indispensable attribute of Islamic Prophet-hood according to Muslims. So according to Muslims, all the Islamic prophets are infallible in the sense that they do not sin or disobey God's orders. Here, God reminds the believers of an important fact to which Muslims must be attentive on the way to God.

References

External links

Quran 40 Clear Quran translation
Q40:1, 50+ translations, islamawakened.com

Ghafir
Islamic theology